Calicophoron daubneyi is a species of digenetic trematode in the family Paramphistomidae. The parasite is commonly found infecting cattle, sheep and goats in France, Spain, Portugal, Italy, United Kingdom, Republic of Ireland, Belgium, Netherlands and Germany.

Hosts 
 Intermediate hosts include Galba truncatula or Omphiscola glabra
 Final hosts include Sheep, Goats and Cattle.

References 

Digenea